Miyagi (written: 宮城 lit. "shrine fortress") is a Japanese surname. It can be read as Miyashiro, or Naagusuku in the Ryukyu Islands. Notable people with the surname include:

, Japanese tennis player
, Okinawan martial artist
Kintaro Miyagi, Filipino footballer
, also known as Kyouko Tonguu, Japanese voice actress
, Japanese model and television personality
, Japanese footballer
Michiko Miyagi
, Japanese koto musician
Mimi Miyagi (born 1973), screen name of Filipina porn star and aspiring politician Melody Damayo
, Japanese manga artist
, Japanese theatre director
Vern Miyagi, United States Army general and civil servant
, Okinawan Marxist

Fictional characters
Mr. Miyagi, a martial arts mentor in The Karate Kid series
Ryota Miyagi, a character in the manga series Slam Dunk
Yō Miyagi, a character in the manga series Junjo Romantica: Pure Romance
Miyagi, the wife of Genjurō in the Japanese film Ugetsu

Japanese-language surnames
Okinawan surnames

Fr:Miyagi#Patronymes